Ancylosis nervosella is a species of snout moth in the genus Ancylosis. It was described by Zerny, in 1914, and is known from Kazakhstan and Russia.

References

Moths described in 1914
nervosella
Moths of Asia
Moths of Europe